This is a list of military aircraft that are being developed for use by the United States military in the near future.
For aircraft in-service see List of active United States military aircraft.

See also
U.S. DoD aircraft designations table
List of military aircraft of the United States

References

United States Active military aircraft, List of
Aircraft
United States military aircraft